This is a list of Maldivian films released in 2020. Several projects that were announced to release during the year were delayed indefinitely and some were pushed for 2021 releases, due to COVID-19 pandemic.

Releases

Theatrical releases

Short film

Digital and television releases

See also
 List of Maldivian films of 2019
 Lists of Maldivian films

References 

Maldivian
2020